FutureWave Software, Inc was a software development company based in San Diego, California. The company was co-founded by Charlie Jackson and Jonathan Gay on January 22, 1993. VP of Marketing was Michelle Welsh who also came from Silicon Beach Software, then Aldus Corporation.

The company's first product was SmartSketch, a drawing program for the PenPoint OS and EO tablet computer. When pen computing did not take off, SmartSketch was ported to the Microsoft Windows and Macintosh platforms.

As the Internet became more popular, FutureWave realized the potential for a vector-based web animation tool that might challenge Macromedia Shockwave technology. In 1995, FutureWave modified SmartSketch by adding frame-by-frame animation features and re-released it as FutureSplash Animator on Macintosh and Windows. By that time, the company had added a second programmer Robert Tatsumi, artist Adam Grofcsik, and PR specialist Ralph Mittman.

In December 1996, FutureWave was acquired by Macromedia, who renamed the animation editor Macromedia Flash.

References

Defunct software companies of the United States
Adobe Flash
Adobe Inc.
Software companies established in 1993
Software companies disestablished in 1996
1996 mergers and acquisitions
Companies based in San Diego